"Dance with Me" is a 1975 hit single by American soft rock band Orleans from their second studio album, Orleans II (1974).

Featuring a melodica solo by Larry Hoppen, "Dance with Me" was introduced on the band's second album, Orleans II, and later included on their third album Let There Be Music (1975). The song was issued as a single on July 19, 1975, to become Orleans' first Top 40 hit, reaching a Billboard Hot 100 peak of No. 6 that October.

Composition
The song was written by group member John Hall and journalist-turned-lyricist Johanna Hall (then a married couple). According to Johanna, John wrote the melody first; Johanna suggested "Dance with Me" as the title after she first heard it, but John rejected the idea as too simple.  The couple were out driving one day when Johanna, struck by inspiration, blurted out the lyrics: "Pick the beat up and kick your feet up", and John was won over to the idea of her writing the song's lyric for the title "Dance With Me".

Reception
Billboard described "Dance with Me" as having a "sweet summer sound" resulting from "soft vocal harmonies" and the acoustic instrumentation.  Billboard also described the hook as being "infectious." Record World said that it "could be for the Let There Be Music men what "Best of My Love" was to Eagles" and that this "mellow invitation should receive positive, multi-format responses."

Chart performance

Weekly singles charts

Year-end charts

References

Songs about dancing
1975 singles
Orleans (band) songs
1974 songs
Songs written by John Hall (New York politician)
Asylum Records singles
Song recordings produced by Chuck Plotkin